Young Wife is a 1978 Soviet drama film directed by Leonid Menaker.

Plot 
Manya and Volodya fell in love with each other in their school years. Then Volodya joined the army, and returned with a new girlfriend. Manya was so offended that he agreed to marry the widower Alexei. But it was difficult for her in a new family and she decides to go to the city enter the technical school.

Cast 
 Anna Kamenkova as Manya Streltsova
 Vladlen Biryukov as Aleksey Ivanovich Terekhov
 Galina Makarova as grandma Agasha
 Sergei Prokhanov as Volodya
 Elena Melnikova as Valya, Manya's friend, Volodya's sister
 Sofya Dzhishkariani as Lyusya, Aleksey's daughter (as Sonya Dzhishkariani)
 Igor Erelt as Volodya's father
 Tatyana Gorlova as grandma Nyura, Aleksey's aunt
 Natalya Nazarova as Tamara, saleswoman
 Igor Ozerov as Igor Pavlovich

References

External links 
 

1978 films
Films directed by Leonid Menaker
1970s Russian-language films
Soviet drama films
1978 drama films